Pahna Pahn (also Romanized as Pahnā Pahn; also known as Paha Pahn) is a village in Aviz Rural District, in the Central District of Farashband County, Fars Province, Iran. At the 2006 census, its population was 372, in 86 families.

References 

Populated places in Farashband County